Deal or No Deal is the second studio album by American rapper Wiz Khalifa. It was released on November 24, 2009, by Rostrum Records and iHipHop Distribution. I.D. Labs produced most of the tracks throughout the whole album, alongside a variety of several record producers such as Johnny Juliano, Monsta Beatz and Sledgren, among others. The album was promoted by a lead single, "This Plane".

Upon its release, the album sold 5,900 copies in its first week. To date, the album sold 167,000+ copies in the United States.

Singles
The album was promoted by a lead single, called "This Plane". The track was produced by Eric Dan, whose a member of the production team I.D. Labs.

Track listing

Charts

References

2009 albums
Wiz Khalifa albums
Rostrum Records albums